Dehradun Cantonment (Dehradun Cantt) is one of the seventy electoral Uttarakhand Legislative Assembly constituencies of Uttarakhand state in India. This seat is previously known as Dehradun Constituency before 2002 Delimitation.

Dehradun Cantt. Legislative Assembly constituency is a part of Tehri Garhwal (Lok Sabha constituency). It includes 15 wards of Dehradun Municipal Corporation and Dehradun Cantonment area.

Dehradun Municipal Corporation Wards

Members of Legislative Assembly

Election results

2022 results

2017 results

2012 results

See also
 Dehradun Cantonment
 Dehradun (Uttarakhand Assembly constituency)

References

External links
  

http://eci.nic.in/eci_main/CurrentElections/CONSOLIDATED_ORDER%20_ECI%20.pdf. The Election Commission of India. p. 509.
http://election.uk.gov.in/Vidhan_sabha2012/form20_2012_PDF/21-Dehradun%20Cantonment.pdf
http://ceo.uk.gov.in/files/Election2012/RESULTS_2012_Uttarakhand_State.pdf
https://web.archive.org/web/20090619064401/http://gov.ua.nic.in/ceouttranchal/ceo/ac_pc.aspx
https://web.archive.org/web/20101201021552/http://gov.ua.nic.in/ceouttranchal/ceo/ac_detl.aspx

Assembly constituencies of Uttarakhand
Politics of Dehradun